The 1630s was a decade that began on January 1, 1630, and ended on December 31, 1639.

References